Shakhtyor Stadium (Shahtıor stadıony) is a multi-use stadium in Karaganda, Kazakhstan.  It is currently used mostly for football matches and is the home stadium of FC Shakhter.

External links
Official website

Football venues in Kazakhstan
Sport in Karaganda